Argument from ignorance (from ), also known as appeal to ignorance (in which ignorance represents "a lack of contrary evidence"), is a fallacy in informal logic. It asserts that a proposition is true because it has not yet been proven false or a proposition is false because it has not yet been proven true. This represents a type of false dichotomy in that it excludes the possibility that there may have been an insufficient investigation to prove that the proposition is either true or false. It also does not allow for the possibility that the answer is unknowable, only knowable in the future, or neither completely true nor completely false. In debates, appealing to ignorance is sometimes an attempt to shift the burden of proof. The term was likely coined by philosopher John Locke in the late 17th century.

Examples 

 "I take the view that this lack (of enemy subversive activity in the west coast) is the most ominous sign in our whole situation. It convinces me more than perhaps any other factor that the sabotage we are to get, the Fifth Column activities are to get, are timed just like Pearl Harbor ... I believe we are just being lulled into a false sense of security." – Earl Warren, then California's Attorney General (before a congressional hearing in San Francisco on 21 February 1942).
 This example clearly states what appeal to ignorance is: "Although we have proven that the moon is not made of spare ribs, we have not proven that its core cannot be filled with them; therefore, the moon’s core is filled with spare ribs."
 Donald Rumsfeld, then  US Secretary of Defense, argued against the argument from ignorance when discussing the lack of evidence for WMDs in Iraq prior to the invasion:

 Carl Sagan explains in his book The Demon-Haunted World:

Related terms

Contraposition and transposition 
Contraposition is a logically valid rule of inference that allows the creation of a new proposition from the negation and reordering of an existing one. The method applies to any proposition of the type If A then B and says that negating all the variables and switching them back to front leads to a new proposition i.e. If Not-B then Not-A that is just as true as the original one and that the first implies the second and the second implies the first.

Transposition is exactly the same thing as Contraposition, described in a different language.

Null result 
Null result is a term often used in science to indicate evidence of absence. A search for water on the ground may yield a null result (the ground is dry); therefore, it probably did not rain.

Related arguments

Argument from self-knowing 

Arguments from self-knowing take the form:

 If P were true then I would know it; in fact I do not know it; therefore P cannot be true.
 If Q were false then I would know it; in fact I do not know it; therefore Q cannot be false.

In practice these arguments are often unsound and rely on the truth of the supporting premise. For example, the claim that If I had just sat on a wild porcupine then I would know it is probably not fallacious and depends entirely on the truth of the first premise (the ability to know it).

See also

Notes

References

Further reading

External links
Fallacy Files – article on Appeal to Ignorance

Relevance fallacies
Ignorance
Barriers to critical thinking